Yu Hyun-mok (July 2, 1925 – June 28, 2009) was a South Korean film director. Born in Sariwon, Hwanghae, Korea (North Korea today), he made his film debut in 1956 with Gyocharo (Crossroads). According to the website koreanfilm.org, his 1961 film Obaltan "has repeatedly been voted the best Korean film of all time in local critics' polls." Yu attended the San Francisco International Film Festival in 1963, where Variety called Obaltan a "remarkable film", and praised Yu's "[b]rilliantly detailed camera" and the film's "probing sympathy and rich characterizations."

His dedication to the intellectual side of film and interest in using film to deal with social and political issues led him to have difficulties both with box-office-oriented producers, and with Korea's military government during the 1960s and 1970s. Korean critics have said his directing style is "in the tradition of the Italian Neorealists," yet "the terms 'modernist' or 'expressionistic' [are] just as applicable to his works."

Besides his directing activities, he has taught film, and made a significant contribution to Korean animation by producing Kim Cheong-gi's 1976 animated film, Robot Taekwon V. A retrospective of Yu's career was held at the 4th Pusan International Film Festival in 1999.

Yu died from a stroke on June 28, 2009.

Filmography

Awards
Blue Dragon Film Awards
Best Picture/Best Director (Descendant of Cain) (1968)
Grand Bell Awards
Best Director (To Give Freely) (1962)
Best Director (Martyr) (1965)
Best Director (Bun-Rye's Story) (1971)
Best Picture (Flame) (1975)
Honorary Director Award (1995)
Korean Film Critics Awards
Best Director (Son of Man) (1980)
Order of Cultural Merit, Korean government - Geumgwan (Gold Crown), 1st Class (2009)
Pusan International Film Festival
Award for Artistic Contribution (2003)

References

External links

The Yu Hyun-mok Page at koreanfilm.org

1925 births
2009 deaths
South Korean film directors
Recipients of the Order of Cultural Merit (Korea)
People from Sariwon
Academic staff of Dongguk University